David Gordon Allen d'Aldecamb Lumsden of Cusehnie, FSAL, FSAS (25 May 1933, in Quetta, Baluchistan, Empire of India (now Pakistan) – 29 August 2008, in Fort William, Scotland) was a Scottish businessman, nationalist and sometime Baron of Cushnie-Lumsden (in Aberdeen).

The son of Henry Gordon Strange Lumsden and Sydney Mary Elliot, he studied at Allhallows, Devon; Bedford School; and Jesus College, Cambridge (MA). He served in the Territorial Army with the London Scottish.

Career
He worked as an executive at British American Tobacco from 1959 until his retirement in 1982. He was the Director of Heritage Porcelain Ltd.
and Heritage Recordings Ltd.

Religious affiliations
 Knight of the Sovereign Military Order of Malta, 1980
 Knight of Justice of the Sacred Military Constantinian Order of Saint George, 1978
 Knight of the Order of Sts. Maurice and Lazarus, 1999

Death
His Requiem Mass in 2008 was the first celebration in St Mary's Cathedral, Edinburgh, since 1969, of Mass as in 1962 Roman Missal, in accordance with Pope Benedict XVI's indication, the year before, that, "for those faithful or priests who request it, the pastor should allow celebrations in this extraordinary form also in special circumstances such as [...] funerals".

Nationalist or secular affiliations
Garioch Pursuivant to the Chief of the Name and Arms of Mar (currently Margaret of Mar, the 30th Countess of Mar)
Co-founder, Scottish Historic Organs Trust (1991 - his death)
Co-founder and Chairman, Castles of Scotland Preservation Trust (1985 - his death)
President, Scottish Military History Society
Admiral the Viscount Keppel Association
Patron of the Aboyne Highland Games (1999 - his death)
President of the 1745 Association/Scottish Military History Society (1991 - his death)
Convenor of the Monarchist League of Scotland (1993)
Member of Lloyd's Register (1985 - 2001)
Member, Council, Royal Stuart Society

References

External links
Cheshire Heraldry obit
 The Daily Telegraph obituary
 Scottish Who's Who
The Herald obituary
The Peerage.com

1933 births
2008 deaths
London Scottish soldiers
Fellows of the Society of Antiquaries of London
Knights of Malta
People associated with Aberdeen
Businesspeople from London
20th-century Scottish businesspeople
Scottish officers of arms
Scottish Roman Catholics
Alumni of Jesus College, Cambridge
People educated at Bedford School
20th-century English businesspeople